Paul Francis Pelosi Sr. (born April 15, 1940) is an American businessman who owns and operates Financial Leasing Services, Inc., a San Francisco-based real estate and venture capital investment and consulting firm. He was the owner of the Sacramento Mountain Lions of the United Football League. He is married to Nancy Pelosi, the 52nd Speaker of the United States House of Representatives.

Early life
Pelosi was born and raised in San Francisco, the youngest in a family of three boys. He is the son of Corinne (Bianchi) and John Pelosi, a wholesale pharmacist. He attended St. Ignatius High School and graduated from Malvern Preparatory School in Pennsylvania. He earned a bachelor of science (BS) in foreign service at Georgetown University, during which he met his future wife, Nancy D'Alesandro, who was attending a Roman Catholic women's college, Trinity College, in Washington, D.C. He earned an MBA from the Stern School of Business at New York University. He has been the chair of the Foreign Service Board at Georgetown since 2009.

Career
Pelosi founded and runs the venture capital firm Financial Leasing Services, Inc., through which he and his wife have a personal fortune of about $114 million.

Having previously invested in the Oakland Invaders of the United States Football League, he purchased the California Redwoods, a franchise in the United Football League, for $12 million in 2009. The Redwoods later moved to Sacramento to become the Sacramento Mountain Lions.

Pelosi's success in stock trading attracted media attention in the summer of 2021, leading to efforts to strictly control individual stock ownership by members of Congress.

Personal life
In 1957, at the age of 16, Pelosi lost control of a car that he was driving on Skyline Highway, a mile north of Crystal Springs Dam in San Mateo County, California and crashed. His older brother David, who was a passenger in the car, died in the crash. Moments before the crash, David had warned his brother to reduce speed. Paul Pelosi was exonerated in the matter by the coroner's jury.

Pelosi married Nancy Pelosi, on September 7, 1963, at the Cathedral of Mary Our Queen in Baltimore, Maryland. They have five children, including Christine and Alexandra. Nancy served as the 52nd Speaker of the House of Representatives from 2007 to 2011 and again from 2019 to 2023.

In May 2022, Paul Pelosi was arrested for driving under the influence of alcohol in Napa County after he crashed into another car at an intersection. Pelosi pleaded guilty in August 2022 and he was sentenced to serving five days in jail, paying $6,800 in fines and restitution, completing a DUI program, as well as three years of probation.

2022 attack

In the early hours of October 28, 2022, an assailant broke into Pelosi's San Francisco home shouting "Where's Nancy?", and subsequently attacked Pelosi with a hammer. The suspect was taken into police custody, while Pelosi was hospitalized with blunt force injuries. He underwent skull surgery after the attack. An initial statement from Nancy Pelosi's spokesperson said doctors expected him to make a full recovery. On October 31, Nancy Pelosi reported he was "making steady progress on what will be a long recovery process." On November 3, he was discharged from hospital. The suspect, 42-year-old David DePape, told police he was on "a suicide mission" and wanted to take Nancy Pelosi hostage, question her, and break her kneecaps if she lied. DePape was charged with multiple crimes including assault, attempted homicide, and attempted kidnapping. He pleaded not guilty to all state charges.

Pelosi first returned to public view over a month later, when he appeared with his wife at the Kennedy Center Honors. He wore a hat and one glove to conceal his injuries.

References

External links

 Profile at UFL-Football.com

1940 births
Living people
American company founders
20th-century American businesspeople
21st-century American businesspeople
American people of Italian descent
American real estate businesspeople
Businesspeople from San Francisco
Georgetown University alumni
Pelosi family
Sacramento Mountain Lions
New York University Stern School of Business alumni
United Football League (2009–2012) owners
Walsh School of Foreign Service alumni